Arthur C. McCall (July 5, 1852 – March 16, 1916) was a Michigan politician.  He was involved in the Mason being a thirty-second degree Mason and was Eminent Commander of the Knights Templar.

Early life
In Camillis, Onondaga County, New York, McCall was born on July 5, 1852.  At age 15, he move with his family to Grand Blanc.  He apprenticed in his father's Grand Blanc harness shop and later took it over.

Political life
In 1878, McCall was elected Constable of Grand Blanc.  He became a deputy county sheriff and turnkey in 1881. With three days remaining, he entered the race for Genesee County Sheriff and won in 1884 and served four years in that office.  Thereafter, he joined the Pettibone and McCall clothing firm of Flint while serving two terms as alderman.  He was elected as the Mayor of the City of Flint in 1894 for a single 1-year term.  In 1896 he ran again for Sheriff and was elected, and re-elected in 1898, serving for four years. In 1901, he was appointed as deputy internal revenue collector serving two terms.

Post-political life
Moving to Jacksonville, Illinois, he ran the Dunlap Hotel.  After his return to Flint, he sold real estate and life insurance.  On March 16, 1916, McCall died and was interred in Evergreen Cemetery, Grand Blanc.

References

Mayors of Flint, Michigan
1852 births
1916 deaths
19th-century American politicians
American Freemasons
Michigan sheriffs
Burials in Michigan